Neil Jones  (born 4 May 1982) is a British dancer and choreographer, best known for his role as a professional dancer in the BBC One dance series Strictly Come Dancing.

Dance career
Jones began dancing at the age of three. He has danced ballet and trained in tap, modern, ballroom and Latin styles.

He has represented Finland, the Netherlands and the UK during the course of his competitive career. He holds 45 dance championship titles, including 8 times British National, 8 times Dutch National, European and 4 times World Latin Champion including World Latin Showdance Champion.

With his partner Katya Jones he was introduced at Blackpool in 2008. The couple became undefeated four-time British National Champions, and the three-time winners of the World Amateur Latin Championships. Katya Jones is also a professional dancer who also appears on the BBC celebrity dancing show Strictly Come Dancing.

In 2016 he appeared in series 14 of Strictly Come Dancing. He was not partnered with a celebrity, but participated in group dances and was on standby for any female celebrity whose partner was unable to dance, though this did not happen. Female dancer Chloe Hewitt performed the same role for the male celebrities. Jones also appeared in the Children in Need 2016 Strictly Come Dancing special, where he was partnered with Hollie Webb. Jones took part in the national Strictly Come Dancing - The Live Tour in 2017.

In August 2021, Jones announced he would be appearing with Katya Jones at Donahey's Dancing with The Stars Weekend in 2022.

Strictly Come Dancing

Performances with Alex Scott 
He partnered former professional footballer Alex Scott, for the seventeenth season of Strictly Come Dancing, the first time he partnered a celebrity. The couple were eliminated in week 11, coming 5th.

* Score awarded by guest judge Alfonso Ribeiro
** Neil was injured during week 6 rehearsals, so Kevin Clifton danced in his place
Red number indicates Alex and Neil were at the bottom of the leaderboard

Performances with Nina Wadia 
From September 2021, Jones was a contestant for the nineteenth series of Strictly Come Dancing, paired with actress Nina Wadia. The couple were the first to be eliminated, in the second week.

Red number indicates Nina and Neil were at the bottom of the leaderboard

Stage performances 
Jones directed, choreographed and starred in dance show Somnium: A Dancer's Dream alongside Katya Jones. The show was performed from the 20th-22 June 2019 at Sadler's Wells Theatre.

In 2021 it was announced Jones would be appearing with Katya Jones at Donahey's Dancing with The Stars Weekends in 2022.

Personal life
Jones was born in the British Army Camp in Münster, West Germany.

Jones married fellow Strictly Come Dancing professional dancer Katya Jones (nee Sokolova) in August 2013. During the 2018 series, media interest in Katya's relationship with her series partner Seann Walsh led to both publicly apologising for their conduct. After six years of marriage, on 18 August 2019, Neil and Katya announced their separation. The Walsh incident was partly blamed for the split, but the couple insisted they would remain friends and would both continue to appear on Strictly. He confirmed in August 2020 that he was in a new relationship, his partner was later revealed to be Colombian dancer Luisa Eusse. In December 2020, Jones and Eusse split. Eusse stated that she was single at a party simultaneously having broken COVID-19 Government Regulations. In late August, Jones and Love Island contestant Chyna Mills appeared on a red carpet together leading to speculation of a relationship, which was later confirmed in September.

References

External links 
 
 
 

British ballroom dancers
British male dancers
Living people
1982 births
People from Münster